3OH!3 (pronounced "three oh three") is an American electronic music duo from Boulder, Colorado, made up of Sean Foreman and Nathaniel Motte. They are best known for their single "DONTTRUSTME" from their album Want, which reached number seven on the Billboard Hot 100. Their second single, a remix of "Starstrukk" featuring Katy Perry from Want, was a top ten hit in the United Kingdom, Ireland, Finland, Poland, and Australia. They gained further recognition by featuring Kesha on the song "My First Kiss", which was made the lead single from their album Streets of Gold. The album later peaked at number seven on the Billboard 200.

History
3OH!3 consists of Sean Foreman, born August 27, 1985, and Nathaniel Motte, born January 13, 1984, both of whom are natives of Boulder, Colorado. Foreman and Motte started their band in 2004 and named it after the 303 area code that had (at the time of their birth) encompassed the entire state of Colorado and that now serves only the Denver metropolitan area and Boulder.

2004–2007: Debut album 
They released their first self-titled album: 3OH!3 in 2007 and it spawned one successful single, "Electroshock." 3OH!3 then signed to Photo Finish Records, a division of Atlantic Records and planned to start recording their second album. After having some hit shows in Boulder, they moved to Denver for the larger venue and fan base.

2008–2009: Want
3OH!3's second album, Want, was released on July 8, 2008. It reached number 44 on the Billboard 200. Their song, "Don't Trust Me" reached number seven on the Billboard Hot 100. The group contributed an original theme song titled "Sex on the Beach" for The Real World: Cancun. 3OH!3 also wrote an anthem for Major League Baseball's Colorado Rockies.

As they were getting started they performed at local venues around Colorado such as the Fox Theatre in Boulder, Colorado and the Aggie Theater in Ft. Collins, Colorado. After playing in Denver during the Warped Tour 2008, 3OH!3 signed on for all venues of Warped Tour 2008. The band performed in Panama City Beach, Florida for MTVU's Spring Break in March 2009 and at The Mile High Music Festival at Dick's Sporting Goods Park along with other artists such as The Fray, Pepper, and Matisyahu. The band later headlined the 2009 Alternative Press Tour across the U.S. 3OH!3 played at End Fest in Sacramento, California, and was part of Kiss Concert '09 at the Comcast Center in Mansfield, MA. They played at Kiss The Summer Hello 2009 at Coca-Cola Field in Buffalo, New York, June 3, 2009. 3OH!3 joined the Warped Tour once again in 2009. In summer 2009 they appeared at the Reading/Leeds festivals in the UK. They performed between award presentations at the MTV Video Music Awards 2009 on September 13.

The duo was featured in a 14-page photo spread in Cliché Magazine's "Green Issue" in August 2009. They released a remix of their second hit single, "Starstrukk," featuring Katy Perry digitally on September 8, 2009. It was a top ten hit in the United Kingdom, Australia, Ireland, Belgium, Finland and Poland. A new song, "Follow Me Down", was written for the compilation album for the film Alice in Wonderland with Neon Hitch. The pair also supported All Time Low, Boys Like Girls, Third Eye Blind, and LMFAO on The Bamboozle Roadshow 2010.

Prior to the release of Streets of Gold, 3OH!3 was featured on the track "Hey" by Lil Jon on his album, Crunk Rock in 2010. They were also featured on the Kesha song "Blah Blah Blah", which peaked at number seven on the Billboard singles chart. On February 5, 2010, it was announced that Cobra Starship and 3OH!3 would be embarking on a co-headlining tour called The Too Fast for Love Tour featuring labelmates I Fight Dragons. The two-month tour covered more than 25 cities, including a date in their home state of Colorado.

2009–2010: Streets of Gold
Streets of Gold was released on June 29, 2010. Kesha was featured on the first single, "My First Kiss". They toured with Hellogoodbye and Down with Webster.

On August 31, 2010, retired professional wrestler Diamond Dallas Page filed a lawsuit against 3OH!3 for copyright infringement of his trademarked "Diamond Cutter" hand gesture. Page previously filed a similar lawsuit against rapper Jay-Z in 2005, which resulted in Page dropping the lawsuit for an undisclosed amount of money.

On December 8, 2010, 3OH!3 announced their very anticipated song "Hit it Again" would be released onto iTunes on December 21, 2010.

The song "I Know How to Say" was used in a trailer for the 2011 animated Disney film "Mars Needs Moms" as well as being featured in commercials for the sci-fi comedy movie Paul, which was also released in 2011.
It was announced in late December 2010 that the duo will be appearing on the CW series Hellcats and performing on it their hit single "My First Kiss", with Ashley Tisdale performing Kesha's parts.

On January 20, 2011, their video for the song "Touchin' on My" from their album, Streets of Gold was released.

2011–2013: Omens

On February 20, 2011, Nathaniel Motte released a statement that they were working on a fourth studio album.

On May 27, 2011, 3OH!3 announced the title and a teaser of the artwork of the song, "Robot". The first time they performed "Robot" live was May 26, 2011, in Norwich, UK. The duo released their new single "Robot" on iTunes June 28.

Cliché Magazine interviewed the duo on future plans and talked of the fourth studio album and the fan submissions for the then-upcoming "Robot" video.

On December 13, 2011, 3OH!3 released the first of three previously unreleased songs, "Bang Bang" on iTunes. "Dirty Mind" followed a week later on December 20, 2011, and the last, "Set You Free", the most successful of the three, was released on December 27, 2011. The group then announced that "Do or Die" would be on the upcoming album, and it was also released on YouTube. On June 25, 2012, Nathaniel announced via Twitter the title of the album to be Omens and said it would be released in the Fall of 2012. On July 9, 2012, Sean Foreman announced the release of the first official single from the album, "You're Gonna Love This", which was released the following day. During a live Ustream chat on the ninth, Foreman also announced songs from the album including: "Black Hole", "Hungover", "Back to Life", and "2 Girlfriends." During a live stream on Google+, Nat revealed a release date for the upcoming album, which was then October 30, 2012. On September 24, 2012, Nathaniel announced via Twitter that the album would be released on December 24, 2012. On November 8, 2012, Nathaniel stated on Twitter that the new song "Youngblood" would be released on November 13, 2012. Nathaniel later announced that fans would have longer to wait for Omens to be released and apologized for the delay. He also announced that 3OH!3 were back in the studio making new songs. On December 18, the single "Do or Die" was released to iTunes. On February 11, Nathaniel and Sean posted on their Facebook page: "March and June – important months for 3OH!3 this year!" They were scheduled to play at Warped Tour in June. According to their website, the new release date is now set for June 18, 2013. The third single from the album, entitled "Back To Life", was made available to stream on 3OH!3's website on March 3, 2013, and was made available for download on March 5.

On March 17, they appeared with Kesha on American Idol performing "Blah, Blah, Blah". On August 6, 2014, 3OH!3 released a statement that they are working on a fifth studio album. The band also collaborated with Blues Traveler on their Blow up the Moon Album and Blow up the Moon Music video.

In 2013, they were interviewed for Contrast Magazine, which was released on March 14, 2016.

2015–2019: Night Sports 
Throughout 2015, the duo had been hinting about new music over social media, but never gave specific dates. On November 7, 2015, Sean Foreman posted a tweet, suggesting fans add his Snapchat as he would be posting behind the scenes videos of a new music video throughout the day.

On December 4, 2015, 3OH!3 released a single, presumably the first from a new album, titled "My Dick". The duo announced the new song via Twitter, linking fans to the music video that Sean had mentioned in November. The only prior hint of its release was a tweet from Nat on December 1, 2015, which was deleted almost immediately after it had been posted.

The band signed to Fueled By Ramen in 2016.

On March 3, 2016, Nat and Sean revealed the title of the upcoming album, Night Sports, on a Facebook live stream. Sean also announced the title to his Twitter followers shortly after. They also announced another single, "Mad At You," which was released in a music video the same night. A music video for "BASMF" was released on March 17, 2016.

On March 22, 2016, the duo announced they'd be playing dates on the Vans Warped Tour on a live broadcast from the Warped Tour's YouTube channel.

The fourth single from Night Sports, "Hear Me Now," was released on April 14, 2016, on 3OH!3's YouTube channel. The song was used on the soundtrack of Madden NFL17.

Night Sports was released on May 13, 2016, as initially announced.

On July 27, 2016, a music video for "Freak Your Mind" was released on Fueled By Ramen's YouTube channel.

In 2017, the band played Warped Rewind at Sea, a 4-day cruise that included Simple Plan, Good Charlotte, and many others. While on board, they hosted a songwriting workshop where the band and around 50 people co-wrote a song called Sauce Daddy. Sauce Daddy was first performed live at their DJ set the next night.

3OH!3 did a surprise performance at Emo Nite LA in March 2018. The band performed on all dates of the final run of the Vans Warped Tour which ran from June to August 2018. On October 4, 2018, it was announced that the band would embark on a tour with Emo Nite and Lil Aaron commemorating the 10th anniversary of WANT throughout the end of 2018.

2020: Sixth studio album and other projects 

During the fall of 2019, the duo teased new music on Instagram, and in November announced a March 3, also known as 303 Day, 2020 concert at the Mission Ballroom in Denver, Colorado. Denver based bands VYNYL and Breathe Carolina, as well as Lil Jon were the openers. In January 2020, they started a weekly morning show called "Cup of JOH!" on Instagram Live in build up to the 303 Day concert, which continued on into August 2020. 303 Day was one of the last concerts hosted at the Mission Ballroom in 2020, with the venue postponing all future shows just ten days later due to the COVID-19 pandemic.

On November 13, 2020, the band released a new song called "Lonely Machines" with duo 100 Gecs which Wall of Sound described as a "cheeky, fun EDM anthem, taking you back to when "Don't Trust Me" was all over the radio."

Touring members
Kamtin Mohager – bass guitar 
Adam Halferty – drums 
Isom Innis – keyboards 
Jesse Cronan – keyboards 
Marshall Gallagher – guitars 
Jared Piccone – drums

Discography

 3OH!3 (2007)
 Want (2008)
 Streets of Gold (2010)
 Omens (2013)
 Night Sports (2016)
 Need (2021)

Filmography

References

External links 

 

American electronic music duos
Electronic music groups from Colorado
Photo Finish Records artists
Musical groups established in 2004
Crunkcore groups
American synth-pop groups
American electronic rock musical groups
Male musical duos
2004 establishments in Colorado
Alternative rock groups from Colorado
Fueled by Ramen artists
Atlantic Records artists